Monarch was launched at South Shields in 1799. She became a transport. In 1809 her owners had her lengthened. In 1816 she made a voyage to Batavia. Then in 1818 she carried migrants from Liverpool to Quebec. She was last listed in 1825. 

In 1813 the British East India Company had lost its monopoly on the trade between India and Britain. British ships were then free to sail to India, the Indian Ocean, or south-east Asia under a licence from the EIC. Monarch made such a voyage, even though she does not appear in the most comprehensive list of such vessels, or in lists of vessels sailing under a licence.

On 16 May 1816, Monarch,  Gascoyne, master, sailed from Portsmouth, bound for Batavia. From Batavia she sailed to Bengal, where she arrived on 1 February 1817. By 10 December she was at the Cape of Good Hope, having come from Bengal. On 5 January 1818 she arrived at St Helena, and the next day sailed for England. She arrived at Liverpool in late February, having lost her mizenmast, sails, and boats in a gale off the Western Islands.

On 16 August 1818, Monarch, Thornhill, master, arrived at Quebec with 50 settlers. The voyage from Liverpool had taken 66 days.

Fate
Monarch continued to be listed until 1825, however she had not been surveyed since 1818, and Monarch, Thornhill, master, did not appear in Lloyd's Lists ship arrival and departure data after 1818.

Citations

References
 

1799 ships
Age of Sail merchant ships of England
Ships built on the River Tyne
Migrant ships to Canada